Sakura Hirose (born 9 September 1997) is a Japanese professional footballer who plays as a forward for WE League club JEF United Chiba Ladies.

Club career 
Hirose made her WE League debut on 20 September 2021.

References 

WE League players
Living people
1997 births
Japanese women's footballers
Women's association football forwards
Association football people from Saitama Prefecture
JEF United Chiba Ladies players